May-Louise Flodin (5 September 1934 – 4 February 2011) was a Swedish model and beauty queen who won the Miss World contest in 1952, representing of Sweden. She was the second winner, and was crowned by her predecessor, Kiki Håkansson, also from Sweden. She died on 4 February 2011, coincidentally the same year as Kiki's death.

References

1934 births
2011 deaths
Miss World winners
Miss Sweden winners
Miss World 1952 delegates
Swedish beauty pageant winners
Swedish emigrants to Jordan